Khataylu (also Romanized as Khaţāylū) is a village in Baranduz Rural District, in the Central District of Urmia County, West Azerbaijan Province, Iran. At the 2006 census, its population was 512, in 127 families.

References 

Populated places in Urmia County